Johann Peter Kirsch (3 November 1861 – 4 February 1941) was a Luxembourgish ecclesiastical historian and biblical archaeologist.

Life 

Johann Peter Kirsch was born in Dippach, Luxembourg, the son of Andreas and Katherine Didier Kirsch. At the age of ten, he went to live with his maternal uncle, Johann Jakob Didier, a priest at Fels. He began his high school education at the Atheneum, and then went to the seminary. He was ordained a priest on 23 August 1884. That autumn he was sent to Rome to attend the Collegio Teutonico. From 1884 to 1890 he studied archeology, paleography and diplomacy at the Collegio Apollinare and at other papal universities in Rome. Kirsch was a student of renowned archaeologist Giovanni Battista de Rossi. In 1887 he was a co-founder of the "Roman Quarterly".

In the spring of 1888, he and Francesco Saverio Cavallari studied inscriptions and catacombs in Syracuse; in Naples he examined lead bulls. That December,
Kirsch became the first Director of the Historical Institute of the Görres Society in Rome.

From 1889 to 1932 he was professor of patristics and biblical archaeology at the University of Fribourg,<ref name=enit>[https://translate.google.com/translate?hl=en&sl=it&u=http://www.treccani.it/enciclopedia/johann-peter-kirsch/&prev=search "Kirsch, Johann Peter", L'Encyclopedia Italiana]</ref> where Clemens August Graf von Galen was one of his students. Kirsch held archaeological lectures and seminars in German and French. In 1907 he founded the "Swiss Journal of Church History". Kirsch spent several weeks in Rome every year and did extensive studies on the early churches of Rome. He also carried out fundamental research on curial financial management in the 13th and 14th centuries. In 1925, Pope Pius XI asked Kirsch to direct the Pontificio Istituto di Archeologia Cristiana in Rome. In 1932, Kirsch was made a prothonotary apostolic.

Monsignor Kirsch contributed many articles to the Catholic Encyclopedia.  He died in Rome on 4 February 1941, and is buried at the Campo Santo Teutonico.

Works
 "Financial management of the College of Cardinals in the 13th and 14th centuries", In Church Historical Studies, vol. 2, No. 4. Münster: Schöningh, 1895.
 The doctrine of the communion of Saints in the ancient Church : a study in the history of dogma, 1910 
 "Roman titular churches in ancient times". In Studies of history and culture in antiquity. Paderborn: Schöningh, 1918.
 "The city of Roman in the ancient Christian feast calendar. Critical textual studies on the Roman Depositiones and the Martyrologium Hieronymianum". In Historical liturgy sources. Münster: Aschendorff, 1924.
 "The station churches of the Missale Romanum. With an investigation of the origin and development of the liturgical station rites". In Ecclesia orans, vol. 19. Freiburg im Breisgau: Herder & Co., 1926.
 The Roman Catacombs'', 1933

Notes

External links
 
 Photo of Johann Peter Kirsch, Professor at Fribourg

1861 births
1941 deaths
People from Dippach
Deaths in Italy
19th-century Roman Catholic theologians
Biblical archaeology
Academic staff of the University of Fribourg
Luxembourgian Roman Catholic priests
Luxembourgian archaeologists
Contributors to the Catholic Encyclopedia
20th-century Roman Catholic theologians
19th-century Luxembourgian historians
20th-century Luxembourgian historians